Paracontias minimus is a species of skinks. It is endemic to Madagascar.

References

External links

Paracontias
Reptiles described in 1906
Reptiles of Madagascar
Taxa named by François Mocquard